National Trust Party (also translated as National Confidence Party) is an Iranian political party based on reformist and populist message.

It was established in 2005 by former Parliament speaker Mehdi Karroubi following his defeat in 2005 presidential election. National Trust Party cooperates with the Reformists' Supreme Council for Policymaking.

Platform
The party has opposed dictating the state religion in Iran and called for an amendment for the constitution of Iran that would limit absolute power of Supreme leader, while endorsing Guardianship of the Islamic Jurist. In foreign policy, it wants détente with the United States. The party regards itself as being committed to the political thought and legacy of Ruhollah Khomeini.

Writing in Iranian Studies, Kaveh-Cyrus Sanandaji states that the party projects a more moderate-reformist platform than the mainstream reformist current associated with Mohammad Khatami, given that it purportedly “does not question the Islamic character of the regime”. According to Muhammad Sahimi, the party has tried to attract the disaffected reformists who are not happy with the Participation Front, Mojahedin, or the Executives of Construction and "is more like a moderate right-wing party than a true reformist/democratic organization".

Members

Party leaders

Current officeholders 

Cabinet
 Masoud Soltanifar, Minister of Youth and Sports

References

External links
Official website

Reformist political groups in Iran
Political parties established in 2005
2005 establishments in Iran
Electoral lists for Iranian legislative election, 2008